Max Dwinger (born 5 December 1943) is a Dutch fencer. He competed in the individual épée event at the 1960 Summer Olympics. His grandfather fenced at the 1908 Summer Olympics.

References

External links
 

1943 births
Living people
Dutch male fencers
Olympic fencers of the Netherlands
Fencers at the 1960 Summer Olympics
Fencers from Amsterdam